Abigail II: The Revenge is the tenth studio album by Danish heavy metal band King Diamond, released in 2002, and is plotwise a successor to the 1987 album Abigail. Abigail II: The Revenge is the first album to feature guitarist Mike Wead, drummer Matt Thompson, and the first to feature bassist Hal Patino since The Eye.

The cover art was done by Travis Smith.

According to the liner notes, the character of Brandon Henry is based on King's friend, Brandon J. Henry, who looks after King's house when he is on the road.

Plot
The plot correlates with that of the original Abigail, and the listener discovers that she is actually the half-sister of O'Brian (the mysterious leader of the Black Horsemen from the original album), and is kept alive by his intervention (the Horsemen having originally planned to nail her into a coffin with silver spikes to prevent her emerging again). The year is 1863, and Abigail has just turned 18 years old. While out walking in the forest, she is caught in a storm that takes her by surprise, causing her to lose her way and stumble upon the LaFey Mansion, the gates to which are locked tight. Certain that she will succumb to the elements, Abigail is surprised to see "Little One", the ghost of the original Abigail from 1777, unlock the gates and disappear into the house. Abigail enters the mansion and is greeted by Jonathan's imposing and shaven-headed servant, Brandon Henry. It is revealed that Jonathan did not die after he fell down the stairs, but uses a wheelchair part-time and must walk with a cane. He has not moved on from Miriam's death and now calls himself Count de LaFey. He greets Abigail, calling her Miriam and believing she is his beloved, who died while giving birth to Abigail. He coaxes Abigail into sleeping with him in his bed, where he rapes her in an attempt to "produce an heir". Abigail, fueled with vengeance, goes to the crypt to see her past incarnation. Brandon Henry, who had warned her to never go into the crypt, finds her there; Abigail takes a sharp necklace from the mummified baby's neck (the same one from The Eye) and slits his throat. She puts broken glass in Jonathan's food, beats him with his cane while he chokes on his own blood, and then sets him on fire, the flames finally killing him. The fire spreads from Jonathan to the window-curtains and finally to Abigail's dress, and she and the mansion are consumed by the flames. As the fire cannot reach the basement, and is therefore unable to destroy the crypt, the spirit of Little One is unable to pass on and is bound forever to the world of the living, crying out for her mother.

Track listing

Credits 
King Diamond – vocals, keyboards
Andy LaRocque – guitar, keyboards
Mike Wead – guitar
Hal Patino – bass
Matt Thompson – drums
Kol Marshall – additional keyboards, strings and harpsichord
Alyssa Biesenberger – voice of "Little One"

References

King Diamond albums
2002 albums
Concept albums
Rock operas
Sequel albums
Metal Blade Records albums
Albums with cover art by Travis Smith (artist)